Artificial antigen presenting cells (aAPCs) are engineered platforms for T-cell activation. aAPCs are used as a new technology and approach to cancer immunotherapy. Immunotherapy aims to utilize the body's own defense mechanism—the immune system—to recognize mutated cancer cells and to kill them the way the immune system would recognize and kill a virus or other micro-organisms causing infectious diseases. Antigen presenting cells are the sentinels of the immune system and patrol the body for pathogens . When they encounter foreign pathogens, the antigen presenting cells activate the T cells—“the soldiers of the immune system”— by delivering stimulatory signals that alert there is foreign material in the body with specific cell surface molecules (epitopes). aAPCs are synthetic versions of these sentinel cells and are made by attaching the specific T-cell stimulating signals to various macro and micro biocompatible surfaces like micron-sized beads. This can potentially reduce the cost while allowing control over generating large numbers of functional pathogen-specific T cells for therapy. Activated and stimulated T cells can be studied in this biomimetic contex and used for adoptive transfer as an immunotherapy.

Essential components of an aAPC

Signal 1
 Modeled after APCs, aAPCs need to have at least two signals to stimulate antigen specific T cells. The first signal is the major histocompatibility complex (MHC), which in humans is also called the human leukocyte antigen (HLA). This is the molecule which is loaded with the specific antigen. MHC class I are found on all cells and stimulate cytotoxic T cells (CD8 cells), and MHC class II are found on APCs and stimulate helper T cells (CD4 cells). It is the specific antigen or epitope that is loaded into the MHC determines the antigen-specificity. The peptide-loaded MHC engages with the cognate T cell receptor (TCR) found on the T cells.

Signal 2
T cells need another signal to become activated in addition to Signal 1, this is done by co-stimulatory molecules such as the proteins CD80 (B7.1) or CD86 (B7.2), although other additional co-stimulation molecules have been identified. When Signal 2 is not expressed, but T cells receive Signal 1, the antigen-specific T cells become anergic and do not perform effector function.

Signal 3 
Signal 3 is the aAPC secretion of stimulatory cytokines such as IL-2 which enhances T cell stimulation, though this is not required for T cell activation.

Types of aAPCs 

Cell-based aAPCs have been produced by transfecting murine fibroblasts to express specific peptide-loaded HLA molecules with co-stimulatory signal B7.1, and cell adhesion molecules ICAM-1 and LFA-3.

Many microparticle systems have been developed as microparticles represent physiologically similar sizes to cells. Microparticle curvature and shape has also been shown to play an important role in effective T cell stimulation.

Nanoparticles have also been used. Nanoparticles have the additional advantage of enhanced transport once injected into the body as compared to microparticles. Nanoparticles are able to be transported through the porous extracellular matrix much easier and reach the lymph nodes where the T cells reside. Also, iron oxide nanoparticles have been used to take advantage of the superparamagnetic properties and to cluster both Signals to enhance T cell stimulation.

Materials which have been used include poly (glycolic acid), poly(lactic-co-glycolic acid), iron-oxide, liposomes, lipid bilayers, sepharose, polystyrene and Polyisocyanopeptides.

Lipid based aAPC 
In natural systems, the dynamic lipid bilayer is crucial for molecular interactions. Lipid bilayer-based particles with a fluid membrane have been developed as aAPCs to replicate interactions between natural APCs and T cells in nature. For instance, it has been observed that in vitro CD4+ T cell activation by MHC-containing liposomes results in T cell proliferation and IL-2 release. It showed how the lipid membrane functions as a support structure for antigen presentation. Even in the absence of T cells, natural APCs have been found to precluster antigens. Researchers have created reconstituted liposomes with membrane microdomains enriched with epitope/MHC complexes to promote T cell proliferation. A higher level of T cell activation is induced by the preclustering of MHC molecules.

Researchers also used solid particles as a core for the lipid bilayer to increase the stability of the liposomes. These are known as supported lipid bilayers (SLBs). For example, nanoporous silica cores.

Polymeric aAPC 
A variety of polymers have been added into aAPC systems, including biodegradable PLGA (Poly(lactic-co-glycolic acid)) and non-biodegradable sepharose or polystyrene beads. While IL-2 or other soluble molecules can be progressively released from within the aAPC, immunomodulatory substances (recognition and co-stimulatory ligands) can be attached to the surface of polymeric particles.

The size and shape of microbeads are important parameters for T cell activation. The optimal size is 4 to 5 µm and optimal shape is non-spherical or ellipsoid, like natural APCs, to increase the contact area of the particles with the T cells.

Inorganic aAPC 
Superparamgnetic particles can be used as aAPC for ex-vivo T cell expansion. These particles can be covalently bound to stimulatory ligands. Another type of aAPCs are high-surface-are carbon nanotubes coated with ligands. these nanotubes whoxed higher T cell activation and IL-2 secretion than other high-surface-area particles.

Uses
aAPCs remove the need to harvest patient specific APCs such as dendritic cells (DCs) and the process of activating the DCs in the stimulation of antigen-specific T cells. As specific cancer antigens have been discovered, these antigens can be loaded to aAPCs to successfully stimulate and expand tumor-specific cytotoxic T cells. These T cells can be then re-infused or adoptively transferred into the patient for effective cancer therapy. This technology is currently being tested within laboratories for potential use in cancer therapy and to study the mechanisms of endogenous APC signaling.

References 

Antigen presenting cells